Lazin is a surname. Notable people with the surname include:

Lauren Lazin, American filmmaker
Malcolm L. Lazin (born 1943), American social activist, prosecutor, entrepreneur and educator

See also
Lavin (surname)